Oliver Christensen (born 22 March 1999) is a Danish professional footballer who plays as a goalkeeper for  club Hertha BSC, and the Denmark national team.

Club career

OB
Born in Kerteminde on the island of Funen, Christensen played in the youth department of his local club, Kerteminde Boldklub, before moving to Odense Boldklub (OB) at under-12 level. There, he progressed through the academy, and completed a trial with Manchester United in October 2016.

In May 2017, Christensen signed a three-year professional contract with OB, and was promoted to the first team. Thus, he became a part of the club until 2020. In the first year of his contract, he still attended classes, after which he would become a full-time professional from the summer of 2018.

He made his professional debut on 22 October 2018 in a Danish Superliga match against Brøndby IF. He impressed during the match, fending off a number of shots on goal from opposing players. He since became established as the starting goalkeeper for OB, gaining the nickname Gribben fra Kerteminde, meaning "the vulture from Kerteminde" due to his large wingspan.

Hertha BSC
On 26 August 2021, Christensen was sold to Bundesliga club Hertha BSC, where he signed a deal until June 2026. On 5 November, he made his debut for the reserve team Hertha BSC II in the Regionalliga Nordost game against 1. FC Lokomotive Leipzig. During the 2021–22 season he did not make any Bundesliga appearance, as Alexander Schwolow and Marcel Lotka were given preference. Hertha finished the season in 16th place in the table and would thus meet Hamburger SV in playoffs for relegation and promotion. Since Lotka and Schwolow were injured, Christensen played both games and was able to keep Hertha in the Bundesliga.

International career
Christensen played two games each for the Denmark under-18 team in 2017 and for the under-19 team in 2017 and 2018, respectively. After gaining a cap for the under-20 side in 2019, Christensen made his debut for the under-21 team on 10 September 2019 in a 2–1 victory in the 2021 UEFA European Under-21 Championship qualification match against Romania in Aalborg.

On 9 November 2020, Christensen was called up to Kasper Hjulmand's senior squad for the friendly against Sweden due to several cancellations from, among others, the Danish national team players playing in England, due to the COVID-19 restrictions, as well as a case of COVID-19 in the squad, which had put several national team players in quarantine. He started the match against Sweden at Brøndby Stadium in his debut match, on 11 November 2020.

Career statistics

References

External links
Profile at the Hertha BSC website

1999 births
Living people
People from Kerteminde
Danish men's footballers
Danish expatriate men's footballers
Denmark youth international footballers
Denmark under-21 international footballers
Denmark international footballers
Association football defenders
Footballers from Odense
Danish Superliga players
Regionalliga players
Bundesliga players
Odense Boldklub players
Hertha BSC players
Hertha BSC II players
Danish expatriate sportspeople in Germany
Expatriate footballers in Germany
2022 FIFA World Cup players